Yndys Novas Guzmán (born 7 November 1977 in Santo Domingo) is a retired volleyball player from the Dominican Republic, who competed for her native country at the 1998 and 2002 World Championships, wearing the number #8 jersey.

There she ended up in 12th and 13th places with the national team. Novas played as a wing spiker and as a libero.

Career
She won the silver medal at the volleyball tournament during the 1998 Central American and Caribbean Games with her senior national team.

Beach volleyball
In 2003, she participated along with Judith Arias at the Pan American Games beach volleyball tournament, finishing 9th.

Clubs
  Mirador (1997–)

References

External links
 FIVB biography
 Beach Volleyball Database profile
 Norceca

1977 births
Living people
Dominican Republic women's volleyball players
Dominican Republic beach volleyball players
Women's beach volleyball players
Beach volleyball players at the 2003 Pan American Games
Pan American Games competitors for the Dominican Republic
Central American and Caribbean Games gold medalists for the Dominican Republic
Central American and Caribbean Games silver medalists for the Dominican Republic
Competitors at the 1998 Central American and Caribbean Games
Competitors at the 2002 Central American and Caribbean Games
Wing spikers
Central American and Caribbean Games medalists in beach volleyball